Ed Wolff (July 2, 1907 — July 7, 1966) was an American actor known for his height of 7'4" and for his monster roles in The Phantom of the Opera (1925), The Phantom Creeps (1939), Invaders from Mars (1953), The Colossus of New York (1958) and The Return of the Fly (1959).

Biography
Wolff was born on July 2, 1907, in Trinidad, Colorado.

Before becoming an actor, he was a circus giant.

His first movie as an actor was The Phantom of the Opera in 1925 at age 18.

Wolf died on July 7, 1966, in Los Angeles, five days after his 59th birthday.

Filmography

References

External links
 

1907 births
1966 deaths
20th-century American male actors
People with gigantism
Male actors from Colorado
American male film actors